The Military Junta of 1956–1957 was a military triumvirate composed by General Roque Jacinto Rodríguez Herrera (Director of the "Francisco Morazán" Military Academy), Roberto Gálvez Barnes (an engineer who was Minister during Lozano's) Government and Héctor Caraccioli Moncada (chief of the Honduran Armed Forces). It was in power October 21, 1956 – December 21, 1957.

They led a peaceful military coup against the unpopular President Julio Lozano Díaz in 1956. This is recorded as the first coup d'état in Honduras.

After many months of ruling over the Honduran people, problems along the "Junta Militar" started, causing the reorganization of the Junta. After this reorganization General Roque Rodriguez and Roberto Galvez Barnes left the Junta and Oswaldo López Arellano entered.

The Honduran Military allowed free and popular elections in 1957 for a Constituent Assembly which elected President for a 6-year term Ramón Villeda Morales.

1950s in Honduras
History of Honduras
Military dictatorships